Tønsberg Gressbane is a football stadium in Tønsberg, Norway. It is the home ground of FK Tønsberg and Tønsberg FK. It was the home ground of Eik-Tønsberg until 2001, when FK Tønsberg was formed.

References

 Tønsberg Gressbane - Nordic Stadiums

Football venues in Norway
Norwegian Cup Final venues
Eliteserien venues
Sports venues in Vestfold og Telemark
Tønsberg